Homer is an unincorporated community and census-designated place (CDP) in Homer Township, Winona County, Minnesota, United States, on the south bank of the Mississippi River.  As of the 2010 census, its population was 181.

Geography
The community is located to the immediate southeast of the city of Winona along Highways 61 and 14, near the junction with Winona County Road 15.  Pleasant Valley Creek and Homer Creek both flow nearby. Nearby places include Winona, Lamoille, Pickwick, Donehower, Dakota, and Dresbach.

History
Homer was platted in 1855, and named after Homer, New York. The community contained a post office from 1855 until 1965.  The Willard Bunnell House, built in the 1850s by Homer's founder, is listed on the National Register of Historic Places and is managed as a historic house museum.

References

External links
 Historic Bunnell House in Homer
 Winona County Historical Society: Bunnell House

Census-designated places in Minnesota
Census-designated places in Winona County, Minnesota
Minnesota populated places on the Mississippi River